The Oldest Living Graduate is the third and final play in the series A Texas Trilogy by Preston Jones.

History
The original name of A Texas Trilogy was The Bradleyville Trilogy.  The trilogy was first performed in its entirety at the Dallas Theater Center in 1975.

Production history
The Oldest Living Graduate premiered at the Down Center Stage in November 1974.

The three plays were first presented together as The Bradleyville Trilogy on in 1975 at the Dallas Theater Center.

The trilogy was most successful under the direction of  Alan Schneider in its premier as A Texas Trilogy at the Kennedy Center's Eisenhower Theater in Washington, D.C. during July and August of 1976.

The trilogy debuted on Broadway at the Broadhurst Theatre on September 23, 1976, directed again by Alan Schneider.  It closed after a mere 20 performances on October 29, 1976.  It featured the following cast:

Clarence Sickenger – Henderson Forsythe
Colonel J. C. Kinkaid  – Fred Gwynne
Floyd Kinkaid – Lee Richardson
Maureen Kinkaid – Patricia Roe
Claudine Hampton – Avril Gentles
Martha Ann Sickenger – Kristin Griffith
Major Leroy W. Ketchum – William LeMassena
Cadet Whopper Turnbull – Paul O'Keefe
Mike Tremaine – Ralph Roberts

Television presentation
The Oldest Living Graduate was performed live April 7, 1980, as the debut presentation of the NBC-TV series, NBC Live Theatre. Performed at Southern Methodist University, the production featured Henry Fonda, George Grizzard, Cloris Leachman and Timothy Hutton. It was NBC's first live drama presentation in prime time in 18 years, when an adaptation of Rebecca aired April 8, 1962, on the series Theatre '62.

References

Sources
https://archive.today/20120713074945/http://alkek.library.txstate.edu/swwc/archives/writers/jones.html

External links
 
 

1974 plays